WR 136 is a Wolf–Rayet star located in the constellation Cygnus.  It is in the center of the Crescent Nebula.  Its age is estimated to be around 4.7 million years and it is nearing the end of its life.  Within a few hundred thousand years, it is expected to explode as a supernova.

According to recent estimations, WR 136 is 600,000 times brighter than the Sun, 21 times more massive, and 5.1 times larger. Its surface temperature is around 70,000 kelvins.

WR 136 blew off a shell of material with a mass of around  when it became a red supergiant around 120,000–240,000 years ago and this is still expanding at 80 km/s.  Currently, its fast stellar wind, ejected from the star at around 3.8 million mph (1,700 km/s), is catching up to the material ejected from the star and shaping it into a shell. Ultraviolet rays emitted from WR 136's hot surface cause the shell to glow.

There is some evidence WR 136 may be a binary star. Its companion would be a low-mass star of spectral classification K or M that would complete an orbit around the Wolf-Rayet star each 5.13 days, being the progenitor of a low-mass X-ray binary system.

References

Further reading

External links
 http://chandra.harvard.edu/photo/2003/ngc6888/
 http://www.giga-parsec.de/WRspectra.html
 http://www.castfvg.it/stelle/spettri/O/wr_136_01.htm

Cygnus (constellation)
Wolf–Rayet stars
Cygni, V1770
192163
099546
Durchmusterung objects